Juan Andrés Fontaine Talavera  is an economist who was Chilean Minister for the Economy, Development, and Reconstruction under President Sebastián Piñera.

Biography
Juan Andrés Fontaine Talavera was born in Santiago, Chile. He received a B.A. in Economics(Ingeniero Comercial, Licenciado en Economía) from Universidad Católica de Chile and an M.A. from the University of Chicago.

In the 1970s, he was deputy editor of the influential opinion magazine "Economía y Sociedad", founded and edited by José Piñera.

In the 1980s he served as Director of Research at the Central Bank of Chile and as a visiting professor at the University of California, Los Angeles.

During the 1990s and 2000s he was partner and chief executive of "Fontaine & Paúl Consultores", a financial consultant firm in Chile, and Minister of Economy from 2010 to 2011.

Currently, he is a member of the "Instituto Libertad y Desarrollo", a  Chilean think tank founded by Hernán Büchi and an economic adviser to several corporations and banks.

He has been an economic advisor to various Chilean presidential candidates, columnist in Chilean newspapers and speaker in conferences on Chilean and Latin American economies.

Fontaine is a professor at Pontificia Universidad Católica de Chile and authored several publications.
He taught for a decade at his alma mater. and at the University of Chile.

References

Living people
University of Chicago alumni
Academic staff of the University of Chile
Pontifical Catholic University of Chile alumni
University of California, Los Angeles faculty
Government ministers of Chile
Year of birth missing (living people)
Chilean Ministers of Public Works